, known professionally as , is a Japanese actress, television presenter, and singer (under the stage name Kakko).

Career
Suzuki was born in Minoh, Osaka and raised in Kobe, Hyogo. At age 17, she was spotted by a CBS records scout when she was commuting to school. Soon after, she moved to the United Kingdom to pursue a singing career. Her first single "We Should Be Dancing" (produced by Stock Aitken Waterman) was released in February 1990 and peaked at number 101 on the UK single chart. Her second release "What Kind Of Fool" did not chart. Met with little success, she returned to Japan in 1991 and began working as an actress. She has become a popular actress in TV dramas and appears in many commercials. 

Suzuki hosted Music Fair from 1995 to 2016.

On 8 July 2022, Suzuki released her first single in 32 years, a re-recording of “We Should Be Dancing” performed as a duet with comedian and singer Takashi Fujii.

Personal life
Suzuki married surgeon Motoo Yamagata in June 1998. The couple met in January 1998 when Suzuki was admitted to hospital for abdominal pain. Yamagata was her operating surgeon. He died of liver disease on 1 February 2013.

Filmography

Film
 High School Teacher (1993)
 Birthday Present (1995)
 ZOO SO-Far (2005)
 What a Wonderful Life!! (2011)
 Aibou Series X DAY（2013）
Waka Okami wa Shōgakusei! (2018)

Television
 Asunaro Hakusho (1993)
 Wakamono no Subete (1994)
 Music Fair (1995–2016), Host
Natsuzora (2019), Ranko Kameyama

Discography

Singles

Solo
 We Should Be Dancing (CBS, 1990) 
 What Kind Of Fool (CBS, 1990)

Kakko and Takashi
 We Should Be Dancing (Yoshimoto, 2022)

Awards

References

External links

  Official Homepage

Japanese women pop singers
Japanese dance musicians
Japanese actresses
Living people
People from Minoh, Osaka
Musicians from Kobe
Musicians from Osaka Prefecture
1969 births